Lelant Saltings railway station was opened on 27 May 1978 to provide a park and ride facility for visitors to St Ives, Cornwall, England.  It is situated on the A3074 road close to the junction with the A30 near the foot of the hill up to Lelant village. The park and ride facility closed in June 2019, replaced by a new one at nearby St Erth railway station, but the Saltings station remains open with a very limited service of trains.

History
The station was opened by British Rail on 27 May 1978 and had a car park for 300 vehicles. A return ticket to St Ives cost £0.60. Cornwall County Council provided £35,000 to build the car park and Penwith District Council paid £15,000 to build the platform. During the first summer nearly 136,000 people were carried from the station, with 3,000 cars using the car park in peak weeks. Nearly 40% of users surveyed said that they would not have visited St Ives if the park and ride was not available. The park and ride closed in June 2019 when a new facility opened at St Erth Station.

Description
There is just a single platform built from pre-cast concrete components, which is on the left of trains arriving from St Erth.

St Ives Town F.C. play their football matches on a pitch at The Saltings next to the station.

Services
All trains are operated by Great Western Railway. Until May 2019, the station was served by two trains per hour between St Erth and St Ives.

Since May 2019 the station is served by a 'Parliamentary service' of just one train per day in each direction (calling at 07:56 towards St Ives and at 09:30 towards St Erth). The reduction in service was due to the relocation of the Park and Ride facility to St Erth. As a result of the reduction in services, Lelant, which previously had a very limited service, is now served more frequently.

References

External links

Railway stations in Cornwall
Railway stations opened by British Rail
Railway stations in Great Britain opened in 1978
Railway stations served by Great Western Railway
DfT Category F2 stations